The Metropolitan Baptist Church is a Baptist church in Largo, MD. The address of the church is 1200 Mercantile Lane in Largo, Maryland.

Reverend Henry Bailey, with ten original members, founded the Fourth Baptist Church in 1864. According to John Wesley Cromwell, the Fourth Baptist Church of Washington D.C., later renamed the Metropolitan Baptist Church, was organized under the guidance of the First Colored Baptist Church of Washington, D.C. which was later renamed the Nineteenth Street Baptist Church. The Metropolitan Baptist Church was located across the street from Camp Barker, which housed a Quaker-run Civil War "contraband" barracks in the Shaw community of Washington, D.C. (then called "Hell's Bottom). It was here, within "Hell's Bottom, that Reverend Bailey and the founders of the Metropolitan Baptist Church began to minister to some 4,000 newly freed slaves. 

Metropolitan holds the distinction of having had only six pastors in its history since 1864: Reverend Henry Bailey (1864–1870); Reverend Robert Johnson (1870–1903); Reverend Moses W. D. Norman, D.D., LL.D (1905–1926); Reverend Dr. Earnest Clarence Smith (1928–1977); Reverend Dr. H. Beecher Hicks, Jr. (1977–2014) and Reverend Dr. Maurice Watson (2015 - present). 

Metropolitan's pastor-emeritus, Dr. H. Beecher Hicks, Jr., was named one of America's greatest black preachers by Ebony magazine in 1993. The church also has a music and arts ministry that is staffed with Richard Smallwood, artist-in-residence.

Dr. Maurice Watson was installed as the sixth pastor of Metropolitan Baptist Church on April 12, 2015. Dr. Watson also has a dynamic itinerant preaching ministry that extends across the continent and globe.

References

Further reading 
 Giving a hero his due--Remembering Commerce Secretary Ron Brown, by Earl Graves, Black Enterprise. Article on Memorial of Ron Brown at Metropolitan Baptist Church, Retrieved from FindArticles.com on July 25, 2007
 Metropolitan Baptist Church lays cornerstone, raises cross at new location, by Liz Skalski, Prince George's Gazette. Article on Cornerstone Laying at new building, Retrieved from Gazette.Net on February 20, 2009
 How Sweet the Sound, Five Area Gospel Choirs That Hit All the Right Notes, by Hamil R. Harris, Washington Post. Article on local music ministries including Metropolitan, Retrieved October 1, 2006

External links
 Metropolitan Baptist Church

Baptist churches in Washington, D.C.
Religious organizations established in 1864
1864 establishments in Washington, D.C.